Decinnamoyltaxinine J is a taxane isolate derived from Taxus brevifolia.

Notes 

Taxanes
Acetate esters
Vinylidene compounds